The 2023 Colombian Women's Football League (officially known as the Liga Femenina BetPlay DIMAYOR 2023 for sponsorship purposes) is the seventh season of Colombia's women's football league. The season started on 4 February and is scheduled to end on 30 June 2023.

América de Cali are the defending champions.

Format
Although interest in holding a full-year women's league championship was expressed first by Colombian Football Federation (FCF) President Ramón Jesurún during the 2022 Copa América Femenina and later by the Colombian Minister of Sports María Isabel Urrutia, on 24 January 2023 the División Mayor del Fútbol Profesional Colombiano (DIMAYOR) announced that the 2023 Liga Femenina season would keep the format used in the previous season, playing the competition in the first semester of the year due to the 2023 FIFA Women's World Cup and the 2023 Copa Libertadores Femenina, the latter of which the country is due to host. The 17 participating teams will play a single round-robin tournament with all teams playing each other once and having a bye day, for a total of 16 matches for each team and 17 rounds in the first stage. The top eight teams will advance to the quarter-finals, with the winners advancing to the semi-finals. The winners of each semi-final will play the finals to decide the champions. All rounds in the knockout stage will be played on a home-and-away, double-legged basis. The champions and runners-up will qualify for the Copa Libertadores Femenina, with a third berth (which was awarded to the FCF for being the host association of the continental competition) going to the best-placed team in the season's aggregate table, other than the finalists.

Teams
17 DIMAYOR affiliate clubs take part in the competition with their women's teams. Fortaleza and Orsomarso did not enter this edition of the tournament, with these teams being replaced by Deportivo Pasto and Boyacá Chicó, the former returning after two years and the latter fielding a women's team for the first time ever. Moreover, Águilas Doradas, who were required by CONMEBOL to form a women's team in order to be able to take part in the men's 2023 Copa Sudamericana, signed a partnership with Cortuluá for this season to meet this requirement.

Stadia and locations

Notes

First stage
The first stage started on 4 February and consists of a single-round robin tournament with the 17 participating teams playing each other once. It is scheduled to end on 21 May with the top eight teams advancing to the knockout stage.

Standings

Results

Top scorers

{| class="wikitable" border="1"
|-
! Rank
! Name
! Club
! Goals
|-
| rowspan=2 align=center | 1
| Lorena Cobos
|Llaneros
| rowspan=2 align=center | 5
|-
| Ingrid Vidal
|América de Cali
|-
| rowspan=2 align=center | 3
| Mayerli Preciado
|Llaneros
| rowspan=2 align=center | 4
|-
| María Camila Reyes
|Santa Fe
|-
| rowspan=4 align=center | 5
| Iranis Centeno
|Junior
| rowspan=4 align=center | 3
|-
| Greicy Landázuri
|Deportivo Pereira
|-
| Laura Orozco
|Deportivo Pereira
|-
| Vennus Pineda
|La Equidad
|}

Source: Soccerway

See also
 Colombian Women's Football League

References

External links 
 Liga Femenina on Dimayor's official website 

2023
W
Col
Col